Randam Varavu is a 1990 Indian Malayalam-language crime thriller film, directed by K. Madhu and written by John Paul. The film stars Jayaram, Rekha, Jagathy Sreekumar and Sukumaran. The film's musical score is by Shyam. This film was a box office flop.

Plot
Jayakumar is a probationary officer in Air India. He is married to Indu, who is a homemaker. Indu had married Jayakumar against the wishes of her father, and so her father is not in good terms with them. Their marriage was solemnised in the presence of Sivanandji, a well known musician and singer. Jayakumar was having a good time with his family and friends. Their joy has no bounds when Indu becomes pregnant.

At that time, Jayakumar receives a letter from his native place inviting him to come to pay homage to his father's brother, who had died a year ago. Jayakumar starts in a train and reaches the railway station at midnight. Since there were no cabs available at the station and he had to travel another 40 km, he walks and reaches a junction where he finds a shared cab, whose driver was calling out for passengers to Pollachi. There were two passengers already in the cab. After waiting for some more time, two more people (Tommy and Alex) come running with a briefcase and join them. On their way, they are stopped by police. Alex and Tommy take their briefcase and make an attempt to escape with the police chasing after them. However, in the hurry Tommy had picked Jayakumar's briefcase. Tommy cleverly surrenders to police allowing Alex to escape with the briefcase. Upon questioning, Jayakumar tells that it is his briefcase and has his identity card in it. But when police open it, they find narcotics. It was then that Jayakumar realizes that their cases got swapped. Adding to Jayakumar's woes, Tommy confesses that he and Jayakumar are partners in peddling drugs and gets both of them arrested. Despite cruel and harsh treatment by the police and the narcotic team headed by Balu and Vishnu, Jayakumar doesn't accept the crime. Jayakumar also faces harsh treatment from the hands of his fellow inmate Vasu. Damu, a thief who does small robbery only to be in jail as he is unfit to do any other job, is the only source of solace for Jayakumar. With his help, Jayakumar beats up Tommy and learns of Balu's involvement in the case. When Balu discovers that the secret has been revealed, he plans to kill Jayakumar and Tommy. For questioning by the narcotics department, Jayakumar and Tommy get transported from prison. As instructed, Alex follows the police jeep in a lorry and hits the police jeep. Tommy and a few policemen get killed on the spot. However, Jayakumar escapes miraculously.

Meanwhile, Indu seeks help from her father to fight out Jayakumar's case. However her father insists on a divorce. Since she was not willing, she goes in search of a lawyer. Finally, she reaches out to Advocate Hariprasad, who had served 15 years as police officer, and then stepped down to become a lawyer. Hariprasad succeeds in getting Jayakumar out on bail, but then Vishnu and Balu visit Jayakumar that night and force him to surrender accepting the crime, otherwise they would file the charge sheet against him, which would result in serious punishment. Jayakumar is confused with it and he discusses the same with Hariprasad. It's then Hariprasad reveals how cruel the drug mafia was to his family. Hariprasad's younger brother was a victim of drugs, and had killed his parent and sister before committing suicide. His fight against drug mafia started since then, and now Hariprasad needs Jayakumar's support for the same. Jayakumar agrees to it. On the way they happen to see Alex visiting customs' officer Stephen's residence. Jayakumar visits Stephen's house pretending that it is a casual visit. Jayakumar leaves when Stephen asks him to do so fearing rumors. Jayakumar and Hariprasad then kidnap Alex and question him. Meanwhile, Balu suspects Stephen; as Alex is missing after visiting his house. Quite dejected, Stephen plans to provide all documents related to drug mafia to Jayakumar. Jayakumar collects the documents adventurously from Stephen, however Stephen is fatally shot. Jayakumar rushes to hand the documents to Hariprasad, however, Hariprasad is killed in a car bomb explosion. He follows Vishnu and kills him after a vicious duel. The main head of the drug mafia Sivanandji reaches Jayakumar's house and asks Indu for the documents that was handed over by Stephen. Indu refuses to hand over the same and she gets thrashed. Jayakumar tracks Sivanandji to the airport and kills him on the runway for all the blood on his hands. The movie ends with Jayakumar being dragged away from the runway by cops as he happily smiles for taking down the racket.

Cast

Jayaram as Jayakumar
Rekha as Indu Jayakumar
Jagathy Sreekumar as Gopi
Sukumaran as Adv. Hariprasad
Devan as DYSP Balu
Babu Antony as Customs Officer Stephen 
Pankaj Dheer as D.I.G Vishnu
Mamukkoya as Damu
K. B. Ganesh Kumar as Tomy
M. G. Soman as R. Sreedharan Nair
Janardhanan as Muralikrishnan Nair
Charu Hassan as Sivanandji
Shivaji as Constable Daniel
Bheeman Raghu as Vasu
Jagannatha Varma as Justice Mukundan Pillai
Kollam Thulasi as Vinod, Police Officer
T. P. Madhavan as Govindan, Public Prosecutor
M. S. Thripunithura as Adv. Ramanuja Iyer
Krishnankutty Nair as Nanappan
James as Balan
Kanakalatha as Dr. Ramani Menon
Alex Mathew as Kannan
Vijayan Peringode as Pappan, Jail Inmate

References

External links
 
 

1990 films
1990s Malayalam-language films
Indian gangster films
Indian crime thriller films
Indian aviation films
Films about organised crime in India
Films about the illegal drug trade
Films shot in Thiruvananthapuram
Films about the Narcotics Control Bureau
Fictional portrayals of the Kerala Police
Films scored by Shyam (composer)
Films directed by K. Madhu